"Lady Luck" is a song by British singer Jamie Woon released as the second single from his debut album, Mirrorwriting.

Formats and track listings
EP
"Lady Luck" (Original) — 4:08
"Lady Luck" (Royce Wood JR Retwix) — 4:03
"Lady Luck" (Hudson Mohawke's Schmink-Wolf Re-Fix) — 3:32
"Lady Luck" (Débruit's Suave Remix) — 3:11
"Lady Luck" (MightyB Remix) — 6:30

7" vinyl
"Lady Luck" — 4:08

Credits and personnel
Main vocals – Jamie Woon
Main production – Will Bevan
Written by – Jamie Woon, Nemo Jones
Mastered by – Stuart Hawkes
Mixed by (assisted by) – Tim Roberts
Mixed by, engineer – John Hanes
Additional production – Royce Wood, Jr., Will Bevan
Programmed by – Jamie Woon, Will Bevan

Charts

References

2010 singles
Jamie Woon songs
2010 songs
Polydor Records singles